The Men's points race at the 2011 UCI Track Cycling World Championships was held on March 25. 18 athletes participated in the contest. The distance was 160 laps (40 km) with 10 sprints.

Results
The race was held at 19:15.

References

2011 UCI Track Cycling World Championships
UCI Track Cycling World Championships – Men's points race